Club de Deportes Independiente de Cauquenes is a Chilean Football club, their home town is Cauquenes, Chile. They currently play in the third level of Chilean football, the Segunda División de Chile.

The club were founded on March 4, 1929 and participated for 10 years in Primera B, 10 years in Tercera División A, 2 years in Tercera División B, And currently plays in the Segunda División de Chile, due to that achieved the ascent as a champion of the Tercera División A 2015.

Seasons played
10 seasons in Primera B
5 season in Segunda División
10 seasons in Tercera División A
2 seasons in Tercera B

Honours
Tercera División: 1
2015

Tercera B: 1
2013

Campeonato Amateur de Clubes Campeones: 1
1990

Current squad 2022

See also
Chilean football league system

1929 establishments in Chile
Football clubs in Chile
Sport in Maule Region
Cauquenes